Calyptomerus is a genus of minute beetles in the family Clambidae. There are at least three described species in Calyptomerus.

Species
These three species belong to the genus Calyptomerus:
 Calyptomerus alpestris Redtenbacher, 1847
 Calyptomerus dubius (Marsham, 1802)
 Calyptomerus oblongulus Mannerheim, 1853

References

Further reading

External links

 

Scirtoidea
Articles created by Qbugbot